O 23, laid down as K XXIII, was an  of the Royal Netherlands Navy that saw service during World War II. During the war she sank and damaged several ships.

Ship history

The submarine was ordered on 9 June 1937 and laid down on 12 October 1937 as K XXIII at the Rotterdamsche Droogdok Maatschappij, Rotterdam. During construction she was renamed O 23, and was finally launched on 5 December 1939. Following the German invasion of 10 May 1940, O 23 was hastily commissioned, still incomplete, and sailed for England on 13 May to be completed at the Thornycroft shipyard at Southampton.

During the war she operated in the North Sea, the Mediterranean Sea and the Indian Ocean. O 23 made twenty patrols during the war in the course of which she sank or damaged five ships. She survived the war and was decommissioned on 1 December 1948, being sold for scrap in April of the following year.

Summary of raiding history
Ships sunk and damaged by O 23.

References

1939 ships
Ships built in Rotterdam
World War II submarines of the Netherlands
O 21-class submarines
Submarines built by Rotterdamsche Droogdok Maatschappij